Jason Paul Laxamana (born September 21, 1987) is a Filipino filmmaker and writer.

Early life and education
Laxamana studied at the University of the Philippines Diliman, receiving a B.A. in Broadcast Communication.

Career
Laxamana's film, Astro Mayabang, received a Special Mention and the Audience Choice Award at the 2010 Cinema One Originals Film Festival. He directed Kapampangan short films and music videos before his first feature in 2010 and organized workshops and film festivals in his home province of Pampanga.

Filmography

Films

Television

References

Articles with hCards
Living people
1987 births
Filipino directors
Kapampangan people
People from Angeles City
University of the Philippines Diliman alumni
21st-century Filipino writers